Jaime Júnior da Silva Aquino (born April 27, 1979 in Brazil), known as just Jaime Júnior, is a retired Brazilian footballer.

References

External links

Jaime Júnior at football-lineups.com

1979 births
Living people
Brazilian footballers
Association football midfielders
Campeonato Brasileiro Série A players
Campeonato Brasileiro Série C players
Campeonato Brasileiro Série D players
Primeira Liga players
Segunda División players
Liga I players
Clube do Remo players
Grêmio Esportivo Anápolis players
Vitória S.C. players
Rio Ave F.C. players
S.C. Braga players
U.D. Leiria players
C.F. Estrela da Amadora players
Racing de Ferrol footballers
Leixões S.C. players
CS Otopeni players
Águia de Marabá Futebol Clube players
Alecrim Futebol Clube players
Campinense Clube players
Itumbiara Esporte Clube players
Expatriate footballers in Portugal
Expatriate footballers in Spain
Expatriate footballers in Romania
Brazilian expatriate sportspeople in Portugal
Brazilian expatriate sportspeople in Spain
Brazilian expatriate sportspeople in Romania
Sportspeople from Belém